The Elders are a six-piece Irish American folk rock band, that formed in Kansas City, Missouri.

The band has released eight studio albums, The Elders, Pass It on Down, American Wake, Racing the Tide, Gael Day, Wanderin' Life & Times, Story Road, and True, as well as four live albums "The Best Crowd We Ever Had", "Live at the Gem", "Alive and Live in Ireland" (which also included a documentary film of the same name by Benjamin Meade) and "The Elders: Hoolie", and one compilation album, "The Best of The Elders Volume 1" which includes some live tracks. They have toured in the United States, Ireland, and Europe.  They also appeared in the 2008 Music Documentary entitled "American Music: OFF THE RECORD; alongside Jackson Browne, Johnny Winter and Les Paul; Dir. Benjamin Meade.

Career
Since forming in 1998, The Elders have released six studio albums, four live albums, one compilation album and three DVDs. The Elders are fronted by Ian Byrne, a native of Ireland's County Wicklow, the band also consists of guitarist Steve Phillips (formerly of The Rainmakers), bassist Norm Dahlor, violinist and keyboardist Brent Hoad (formerly of The Secrets), drummer Kian Byrne, and fiddler Colin Farrell (Creel and Gráda).

They have played festivals, pubs and theaters across the United States, Ireland and other parts of Europe. The band has performed at festivals in Philadelphia, New York City, Cleveland, Chicago, Milwaukee, Denver, and Dublin, Ohio and others.

The Elders' songs have been played on more than 120 U.S. radio stations and have been featured live on WoodSongs Old-Time Radio Hour. Their "Live at the Gem" concert show was broadcast on more than 100 PBS stations.

In 2018, the band discontinued regular touring.

On September 30, 2020, it was announced that guitarist Steve Phillips died due to pulmonary fibrosis caused by COVID-19.

Members

Current members
Ian Byrne– vocals, bodhrán, percussion
Norm Dahlor – bass, banjo, guitar, vocals
Kian Byrne – drums, percussion, mandolin, bass
Diana Ladio - fiddle

Former members
Michael Bliss – vocals, bass
Tommy Dwyer – drums
Randy Riga – accordion
Brett Gibson – accordion
Tommy Sutherland - Drums, Percussion
Joe Miquelon - keyboards
Shawn Poores - Drums
Colin Farrell - fiddle, whistles
Steve Phillips – guitar, mandolin, vocals

Discography
 The Elders (2000)
 Pass It on Down (2002)
 American Wake (2004)
 The Best Crowd We Ever Had (2004)
 Live at the Gem (2005)
 Racing the Tide (2006)
 Alive and Live in Ireland (2007)
 Gael Day (2009)
 The Best of The Elders Volume 1 (2010)
 Wanderin' Life & Times" (2011)
 "The Elders: Hoolie" (2012)
 "Story Road" (2014)
 "True" (2017)

Filmography
"Live at the Gem" (2005)
"Alive and Live In Ireland" (2007)
"American Music: OFF THE RECORD" (2008)
"The Elders: Hoolie" (2012)
"Live at The Uptown Theater" (2014)

References

External links

The Elders' Official website
The Elders' Verified profile on Facebook
The Elders' Official Youtube Channel
The Elders' Official MySpace.com
Read Reviews for the album Gael Day
Celt In A Twist podcast that often features The Elders
PaddyRock voted Racing the Tide'' their top album of 2006
Review by the Kansas City Star
Tour Dates

Musical groups from Kansas City, Missouri
American folk rock groups
Celtic fusion groups